is a railway station on the Muroran Main Line located in Noboribetsu, Hokkaidō, Japan operated by Hokkaido Railway Company (JR Hokkaido).

Adjacent stations

Railway stations in Hokkaido Prefecture
Railway stations in Japan opened in 1953